The Maserati Ghibli (Tipo M157) is an executive car produced by Italian automobile manufacturer Maserati since 2013. The car was unveiled to the public at the 2013 Shanghai Motor Show.

Overview

The Ghibli marks Maserati's comeback in the mid-size luxury car segment after two decades of absence, since the last of the Biturbo family saloons went out of production in 1994; it is a key model in Maserati's plan of reaching a production target of 50,000 units by 2015, expanding its lineup to cover all segments in the luxury car market.
Assembly of the Ghibli takes place alongside that of the Quattroporte VI at the new Giovanni Agnelli Plant in Grugliasco near Turin, Italy. On September 24, 2019, the 100,000th Ghibli rolled off the production line as announced by Maserati.

Concept cars

Ghibli Zegna Edition Concept

At the 2014 Paris Motor Show Maserati presented the Ghibli Zegna Edition Concept, a concept car previewing the marque's second collaboration with Italian fashion house Ermenegildo Zegna after the Quattroporte Zegna limited edition. The cabin is upholstered in Poltrona Frau leather and anthracite Zegna silk fabric; the exterior features triple-layer "Azzurro Astro" paint and special "Liquid Silver" 20 inch wheels. The concept car is based on a Ghibli S Q4.

Variants

Ghibli
The Ghibli was introduced at the 2013 Shanghai Auto Show and marked Maserati's entry into the mid-size executive car market as being positioned below the Quattroporte. The Ghibli is the first car to be underpinned by the Maserati M156 platform and was the company's best seller until the Levante crossover SUV was launched. The company sold 6,000 units of the car in its first year into the market, which alone exceeded the best sales figures for Maserati for 2008, which was 9,000 cars sold in total of different models. The number increased to 22,500 in 2013 and 36,448 in 2014. It continued to increase in 2015 due to the delay in the Levante's launch.

The Ghibli also marks the return of the name in the US market as the Biturbo based Ghibli (AM336) was not available for sale there.

The diesel engine in the Ghibli, developed under Ferrari engine specialist Paulo Martinelli, is based on the V6 diesel unit found in the Jeep Grand Cherokee. The engine is exclusive to the European market only. A ZF 8HP transmission powers the rear wheels as used by all the major competition except Mercedes-Benz.

The Ghibli, which is based on a shorter wheelbase than the flagship Quattroporte, uses a steel monocoque chassis with additional  subframes with the front subframe made of aluminium. Tested weight distribution for the diesel version stands at 51/49 front/rear.

Both the Ghibli and the Quattroporte share the same suspension although the Skyhook suspension is optional on the former. An optional Koni adaptive sport suspension is also available. From the 2018 model year the Ghibli can be optioned with one of two new trims, namely GranSport and GranLusso, all of which relate to the interior of the car with the GranSport trim featuring an aggressive front bumper.

The Ghibli uses a customized version of the Uconnect infotainment system found in other FCA vehicles like the Dodge Charger. Buyers have different leather upholstery for the interior to choose from. An Alcantara headliner, a premium Harman Kardon or Bowers and Wilkins sound system, wood, carbon fiber and optional metal and weaved leather interior inserts and steering wheel are available as an option.

Safety features and amenities include adaptive cruise control, adaptive LED headlights supplied by Magnetti Marelli, lane keep assist, steering assist and brake force assist. The car received a five-star crash test rating from NCAP due to these features.

Ghibli S
The S is a high-performance variant of the Ghibli boasting power output and performance improvements. Despite the similarities to the Alfa Romeo V6 engine, which is also manufactured by Ferrari, the Maserati engine is not related to the Alfa Romeo engine since the Maserati engine is a 60-degree V6 (using a block cast by Chrysler) rather than Alfa Romeo's 90-degree unit. The same unit is also used by the high performance version of the Levante SUV as well as some Quattroporte models.

The Ghibli S was initially equipped with a hydraulic power steering which was changed to an electric power steering when the Ghibli range received updates. It also benefits from the same safety features as the base Ghibli.

Ghibli Neiman Marcus
In occasion of Maserati's centenary, the limited edition Maserati 100th Anniversary Neiman Marcus Ghibli S Q4 is the luxury car included in the 2014 edition of the Neiman Marcus Christmas Book gift catalogue. It is distinguished by Grigio Maratea paint over a Cuoio tan leather interior, forged multi-spoke wheels and black grille surround. The allotment is limited to 100 units, each priced at $95,000.

2020 Facelift
A face lifted Maserati Ghibli and hybrid version was unveiled online on 16 July 2020. 
In a world’s first, the hybrid version of the Ghibli features a 2.0L turbocharged 4 cylinder petrol engines, with a 48 volt electric supercharger "e-Booster" and supported by a battery. 
The battery is mounted in the rear of the car, which Maserati claims benefits the weight distribution. The hybrid version weighs around  less than the Diesel version. The car has a maximum output of 330 horsepower and torque of 450 Nm delivered from 1,500 rpm.

Specifications

The Maserati Ghibli shares the architecture of the sixth-generation of the Maserati Quattroporte, but sits on a  shorter wheelbase for a  shorter overall length. Suspension is a double wishbone unit at the front axle and 5-link multilink unit at the rear axle; Maserati's Skyhook adaptive damping system is optional. All Ghibli models employ a ZF 8-speed 8HP automatic transmission and a rear limited slip differential.
The braking system uses vented discs on all four corners, four-piston callipers at the front and floating callipers at the rear; the S models come with larger cross-drilled dual-cast rotors, six-piston callipers at the front and four-piston calipers at the rear.

Engines

From launch, the Ghibli is available with a choice of two petrol and one diesel engines: a 3.0-litre  twin-turbocharged V6 in the base Ghibli models, a  twin-turbocharged V6 in the 
high performance Ghibli S or Ghibli S Q4 (all wheel drive version, which is only available with this engine), or a  3.0-litre V6 turbo-diesel in the Ghibli Diesel.

The petrol engine is a  60° V6. It utilizes a turbocharger per cylinder bank, twin intercoolers and direct injection. The engine is designed and assembled by Ferrari.

The Ghibli is the first Maserati in history to be offered with a diesel engine.

Q4 all-wheel drive system
The high performance S version of the Ghibli is also available with all-wheel drive. Attached to the end of the 8-speed transmission is a transfer case, containing an electronically controlled multi-plate wet clutch, which sends power through a drive shaft to an open differential bolted to the oil pan.
During normal operation the car is rear-wheel drive only; when needed the system can divert up of 50% of engine power to the front wheels.
The system adds  to the weight of the car, with no change in gas mileage or weight distribution. All-wheel-drive Maserati vehicles make up 70 percent of the company's sedan sales in the United States. The powertrain is the same as that in the Quattroporte VI (Q4).

Sales

Safety

The Maserati Ghibli passed the Euro NCAP car safety tests in 2013, receiving a five-star rating.

In 2013 the US-specification 2014 Maserati Ghibli was tested by the Insurance Institute for Highway Safety, receiving "Good" rating in all four tests (moderate overlap front impact, side impact, roof strength, head restraints and seats); it therefore qualified for the 2013 Top Safety Pick.

In 2021, the Trofeo includes features such as: Full-speed adaptive cruise control, traffic-sign recognition, blind-spot monitoring, lane-keeping assist, automatic emergency braking.

Marketing
In the United States, the Ghibli was used in a commercial during Super Bowl XLVIII called "Strike", which aired on 2 February 2014. This marked the first time that Maserati aired an ad in the United States, which is part of Fiat Chrysler's promotional push to expand its brands in North America, as it prepared to sell the Ghibli there in the first quarter of 2014.

References

External links

Official site

Ghibli (M157)
Mid-size cars
Luxury vehicles
Executive cars
Sedans
Cars introduced in 2013
Rear-wheel-drive vehicles
All-wheel-drive vehicles
Euro NCAP executive cars